Aleksei Kapitonovich Gastev (8 October 1882, Suzdal,  Vladimir  Governorate – 15 April 1939, Kommunarka, Moscow) was a Russian revolutionary, a pioneering theorist of the scientific management of labour in Soviet Russia, a trade-union activist, and an avant-garde writer and poet.

Biography

Youth of a revolutionary 
Born to a family of a teacher and a seamstress in Suzdal, Russia, Aleksei Gastev's childhood is largely unknown. His revolutionary acts began once he participated in revolutionary meetings at the Moscow Pedagogical Institute, but he was expelled as a result. He joined the Russian Social Democratic Labour Party in 1901 and participated in the Russian Revolution of 1905; Gastev was the leader of a fighting squad in Kostroma and incited workers to strike in the Northern Russian cities of Yaroslavl, Ivanovo-Voznesensk and Rostov. During this time, Gastev was closely associated with the Bolshevik faction of the party; he frequently corresponded with Vladimir Lenin and his wife, Krupskaya, on matters of party policy in 1903-1904 and reported to Lenin on the general strike in Ivanovo-Voznesensk in 1905.

As a result of his revolutionary activism, Gastev was arrested by the authorities and exiled to various parts of Northern and Eastern Russia in at least three separate incidents. He was nevertheless able to escape from his exiles each time, living illegally in Russia and usually managing to find his way abroad. In 1907, Gastev dissociated himself from the activities of the Bolshevik faction and officially left the party in 1908.

Industrial and trade-union work  
From 1901 until 1917, Gastev's time was divided between exiles, escapes, and work in Russian or European factories. His experience as a factory worker led him to develop a rather practical approach to Marxism. Revolution for Gastev meant empowering workers by allowing them to control everyday matters related to work-processes. Gastev became involved in the work of the Petersburg Union of Metal Workers, one of the most influential trade-unions in Russia, in 1907.
In 1908 he got work with the Vasileostovskii Trolley Depot. Here he was chosen to monitor wear and tear on the transmission belts and sprockets and analyze the repair process of the trolley cars. It was here that he first thought of developing a "science for the social construction of enterprises".

In 1910, he was again arrested but when he was sent to Siberia, he escaped to Paris, where he worked for the motor-car manufacturer Clément-Bayard. Here he first became familiar with quality assurance which was carried out in a particularly thorough fashion. By 1912 he was working for Citroën where he witnessed the application of assembly line production which was inspired by the Ford plant in the United States. At that time, he became familiar with French Syndicalism and adopted many of its views, seeing trade unions as a chief means of confronting capitalism by bringing concrete improvements into the lives of workers. By 1913, Gastev had joined the Circle of Proletarian Culture, composed of revolutionary writers of Anatoly Lunacharsky, Fedor Kalinin, Pavel Bessalko and Mikhail Gerasimov. In 1917-1918, Gastev won election as the Chairman of the Central Committee of the newly created All-Russian Union of Metal Workers. He actively participated in the 1918 Conference of the Union.

Scientific management 

In 1920, Gastev became the founder and Director of the Central Institute of Labour (CIT) in Moscow, which he referred to as his "last work of art". The institute was encouraged by Lenin, who promised to allocate the initial funding of the project. The institution developed scientific approaches to work management, which in practical terms amounted to methods of training workers to perform mechanical operations in the most efficient way. Simple repetitive operations (like the cutting of materials with a chisel) were studied in great detail, allowing for more efficient operations to be developed. 
According to Figes (1996), Gastev "As the head of the Central Institute of Labor, established in 1920, he carried out experiments to train the workers so that they would end up acting like machines. Hundreds of identically dressed trainees would be marched in columns to their benches, and orders would be given out by buzzes from machines. The workers were trained to hammer correctly by holding a hammer attached to and moved by a hammering machine so that after half an hour they had internalized its mechanical rhythm. The same process was repeated for chiseling, filing, and other basic skills. Gastev's aim, by his own admission, was to turn the worker into a sort of 'human robot' (a word, not coincidently, derived from the Slavic noun robota meaning work). Since Gastev saw machines as superior to human beings, he thought this would represent an improvement in humanity."

Platon Kerzhentsev criticized Gastev's Taylorist approach for adopting a "narrow base" by focusing on the worker rather than looking at the more general aspects of how production should be organized in a socialist society. In 1921 the Central Council of Scientific Organization of Labor (SOVNOT) was set up with both factions involved. In 1924 the All-Russian Scientific Management Conference was held in Moscow, where both Gastev and Kerzhentsev argued their case. The conference sided with Gastev, although Kerzhentsev argued that the CIT had wasted three years. From 1932 to 1936 he was the chairman of the All-Union Committee for Standardization (Gosstandart) under the Council of Labor and Defense, as well as the editor-in-chief of the journal Bulletin of Standardization.

Ustanovka
In 1928, in an effort to increase the funding of the CIT, Gastev organized the Ustanovka ("Setup") as a social enterprise (joint-stock company) which audited the work of industrial enterprises and provided recommendations on efficient organization of their work processes on a commercial basis. Here Gastev applied his ideas on education, based on his concept of "social engineering", meaning the creation of training methods based on the physiological and psychological study of humans in the work process, using both observational and experimental methods. This led to the creation of the "setup method" (установочный метод), which viewed the conditioning of human faculties as a basis for reform of the educational system in its entirety. The term "setup" (установка) implied the formation of personal automated behaviors through "biological setups", "cultural setups", etc. Gastev's methods were used in intensive trainings of qualified workers and were highly successful.

Poetry 
Gastev's Poeziia rabochego udara, (Poetry of the worker's blow), was the first book published by Proletkult in 1918.
Most of Gastev's poems may be fairly labeled prose poetry. The rhythm is usually not organized enough to qualify for verse, the rhyme is absent, the poems are written in the form of prose pieces. However, the use of metaphor, lyrical expressiveness, and repetitiveness of syntax undoubtedly make Gastev a true lyrical poet, with influences ranging from Verhaeren and Walt Whitman to the Russian Futurists.

Gastev's poetry energetically celebrates industrialization, announcing an era of a new type of human, trained by the overall mechanization of everyday life. In the 1920s Gastev abandoned his literary work completely, dedicating himself to his scientific management research. However, many of his later publications on non-poetic topics are written in the expressive language of prose poems.

Arrest and death 
On September 8, 1938, Gastev was arrested on false charges of "counter-revolutionary terrorist activity". He was detained in a Moscow prison and sentenced to death by a speedy trial on April 14, 1939. There was no defense attorney and no possibility to appeal against the decision, as was common during the Great Purge. On April 15, 1939, Gastev was shot to death in the suburbs of Moscow.

October 1, 1941, the date of Gastev's death given by some sources, is based on false information given by the authorities to Gastev's family prior to 1991. No reliable information about Gastev's fate after his arrest was available until the KGB archive, where the interrogation and trial documents were kept, became accessible to relatives in the early 1990s.

Legacy
Gastev's legacy is commemorated by the Gastev's Cup by the "Lean Forum. Lean Production Professionals" Inter-Regional Public Movement. His son Yuri Gastev was a prominent soviet mathematician and dissident who eventually emigrated to the USA.

Works 
 Poeziya rabochego udara (Поэзия рабочего удара). Moscow. 1964, 1971.
 Kak nado rabotat? (Как надо работать?). Moscow, Ekonomika. 1966, 1972.
 Trudovye ustanovki (Трудовые установки). Moscow, Ekonomika. 1973.

References 

 Johansson, Kurt. Aleksej Gastev, Proletarian Bard of the Machine Age. Stockholm, 1983.
 Bailes, K.E. Alexei Gastev and the Soviet Controversy over Taylorism, 1918-1924 // Soviet Studies. Glasgow, UK. 1977.
 Maier, C.S. Between Taylorism and Technology: European Ideologies and the Vision of Industrial Productivity in the 1920s // Journal of Contemporary History. London. 1970. Vol. 5. No. 2. P. 27-61.
 Sorenson J.B. The Life and Death of Soviet Trade Unionism, 1917-1928. New York, 1969.
 Williams, R.C. Collective Immortality: The Syndicalist Origins of Proletarian Culture, 1905-1910 // Slavic Review. Champaign, IL, USA. 1980. Vol. 5. No. 3. P. 389-402.

See also 

 The Ghost of the Executed Engineer, primarily about the Russian engineer Peter Palchinsky (1875–1929)
 An American Engineer in Stalin's Russia: The Memoirs of Zara Witkin, 1932-1934.  Witkin, Zara (1900-1940).
 Alexander Dolgun (1926-1986) survivor of the Soviet Gulag who returned to his native United States.
 John H. Noble (1923–2007) American survivor of the Gulags
 Robert Robinson (engineer) (1907-1994) Jamaican-born toolmaker who initially worked in the US auto industry but spent 44 years in the Soviet Union (1930-1974).
 Thomas Sgovio (1916-1997) American artist, and former inmate of a Soviet GULAG camp in Kolyma
 Victor Herman (1915-1985) Jewish-American initially known as the 'Lindbergh of Russia', who then spent 18 years in the Gulags of Siberia.

1882 births
1939 deaths
People from Suzdal
Recipients of the Order of the Red Banner of Labour
Old Bolsheviks
Great Purge victims from Russia
Soviet people